The 1976 United States Senate election in Wisconsin was held on November 2, 1976. Incumbent Democrat William Proxmire defeated Republican nominee Stanley York in a landslide, taking 72.20% of the vote.

General election

Candidates
Major party candidates
William Proxmire, Democratic
Stanley York, Republican

Other candidates
William O. Hart, Independent
Robert Schwarz, Socialist Workers
Michael A. MacLaurin, Independent
Robert E. Nordlander, Socialist Labor

Results

See also
 1976 United States Senate elections

References

1976
Wisconsin
United States Senate